Françoise Leclerc (d. 1739) was a French fashion merchant and seamstress, and the official seamstress of the French queen Marie Leszczyńska. She was a leading figure of the fashion world in Paris during the 1720s and 1730s, with a large clientele from within the French aristocracy.

References

1739 deaths
18th-century French businesspeople
French fashion designers
Year of birth unknown